Bronisław Abramowicz (1837–1912) was a Polish painter, born in Załuchów.

In the years 1858-1861 he studied at the Academy of Fine Arts in Warsaw. He continued to study painting in the academy of fine arts in Munich and Vienna. He also graduated from the Academy of Fine Arts in Kraków. He painted historical paintings, genre scenes and portraits of hunting, including Bavarian King Ludwig III (1867). From 1868, he participated in exhibitions in Kraków. His works of art restoration are found in old churches of Kraków and his paintings in the national gallery.

References

1837 births
1912 deaths
People from Volyn Oblast
People from the Russian Empire of Polish descent
19th-century Polish painters
19th-century Polish male artists
20th-century Polish painters
20th-century Polish male artists
Academy of Fine Arts in Warsaw alumni
Modern painters
Polish male painters